Godfried or Godfrey van Rhenen (died on 27 May 1178) was a bishop of Utrecht from 1156 to 1178.

Godfrey was appointed with support from Frederick I, Holy Roman Emperor in 1159 to deal with a revolt of citizens and his own ministers as a consequence of the struggle between the papal-supporting Welfs and the emperor-supporting Hohenstaufen, in which Godfrey supported the Hohenstaufen. The revolt was ended in 1160 in favour of the bishop. After this he busied himself with strengthening his position in the Oversticht and in Friesland. This led to a conflict with Floris III, Count of Holland in 1165, in which the emperor mediated. Bishop Godfrey built forts at Vollenhove and Montfoort.

External links
 Godfried van Rhenen biography (in Dutch)

1178 deaths
12th-century Roman Catholic bishops in the Holy Roman Empire
Prince-Bishops of Utrecht
Year of birth unknown